Brochocoleus is an extinct genus of beetles in the family Ommatidae, known from the Early Jurassic to the Early Late Cretaceous. 9 species are currently recognised, with many species being reassigned to other genera by Kirejtshuk's major systematic revision in 2020.

 †Brochocoleus alatus Ponomarenko, 1994 Ulan-Argalant Formation, Mongolia, Barremian
 †Brochocoleus cossiphus Ponomarenko, 1994 Dzun-Bain Formation, Mongolia, Aptian
 †Brochocoleus keenani Jarzembowski, Yan, Wang & Zhang, 2013 Weald Clay, United Kingdom, Barremian
 †Brochocoleus maculatus (Whalley 1985) Charmouth Mudstone Formation, United Kingdom, Sinemurian
 †Brochocoleus maximus Jarzembowski, Yan, Wang & Zhang, 2013 Purbeck Group, United Kingdom, Berriasian
 †Brochocoleus planus Ponomarenko, 1994 Dzun-Bain Formation, Mongolia, Aptian
 †Brochocoleus punctatus Hong, 1982 (type species) Chijinbao Formation, China, Aptian
 †Brochocoleus rostratus Ponomarenko, 1999 Kzyl-Zhar, Kazakhstan, Turonian
 †Brochocoleus tobini Jarzembowski, Yan, Wang, & Zhang, 2013 Weald Clay, United Kingdom, Hauterivian

Formerly assigned species 

 †Brochocoleus angustus Tan, Ren, & Shih, 2007 Moved to Pareuryomma
 †Brochocoleus aphaleratus (Ponomarenko, 1969) Moved to Allophalerus
 †Brochocoleus applanatus Tan & Ren, 2009 Moved to Diluticupes
 †Brochocoleus caseyi Jarzembowski, Wang, & Zheng, 2016 Moved to Jarzembowskiops
 †Brochocoleus crowsonae Jarzembowski, Yan, Wang, & Zhang, 2013 Moved to Diluticupes 
 †Brochocoleus impressus (Ren, 1995) Moved to Diluticupes
 †Brochocoleus indibili Soriano & Delclòs, 2006 Considered indeterminate by Kirejtshuk, 2020
 †Brochocoleus magnus Tan & Ren, 2009 Moved to Diluticupes
 †Brochocoleus minor Ponomarenko, 2000 Moved to Diluticupes
 †Brochocoleus sulcatus Tan, Ren, & Shih, 2007 Moved to Odontomma
 †Brochocoleus validus Tan & Ren, 2009 Moved to Diluticupes
 †Brochocoleus yangshuwanziensis Jarzembowski, Yan, Wang, & Zhang, 2013 Moved to Diluticupes
 †Brochocoleus zhiyuani Liu, Tan, Jarzembowski, Wang, Ren, & Pang, 2017 Moved to Burmocoleus

References

Ommatidae
Prehistoric beetle genera